Hódmezővásárhelyi Futball Club is a professional football club based in Hódmezővásárhely, Csongrád County, Hungary, that competes in the Nemzeti Bajnokság III, the third tier of Hungarian football.

Honours

Domestic
Csongrád megyei labdarúgó-bajnokság I:
Winner (1): 2014–15

References

External links
 Profile on Magyar Futball

Football clubs in Hungary
Association football clubs established in 1996
1996 establishments in Hungary